Russell John Kiefel (1951 – 20 November 2016) was an Australian stage, film and television actor. After graduating from the National Institute of Dramatic Art, Kiefel started his screen acting career with a role in the 1977 feature film The Singer and the Dancer. He followed this with roles in Breaker Morant (1980), Twelfth Night (1986), Call Me Mr. Brown (1990) and television film The Leaving of Liverpool (1992). Kiefel appeared in several television dramas, including Home and Away, Fireflies and Stingers. He starred in an episode of Twisted Tales in 1998. Among his various guest appearances were episodes of  Wildside, Blue Heelers and Something in the Air. In 2008, Kiefel played Lloyd Ross in Infamous Victory: Ben Chifley's Battle for Coal. He joined the cast of Neighbours in the recurring role of Russell Brennan in 2015.

Kiefel worked with various theatre companies throughout his stage career, appearing in numerous productions. His earliest roles were with the Old Tote Theatre Company. He appeared in both the Australian and American seasons of A Streetcar Named Desire and Travelling North. Kiefel was closely associated with Belvoir and appeared in several productions for them, including Run Rabbit Run and The Blind Giant is Dancing. He starred in the 2009 production of The Alchemist at the Sydney Opera House. Kiefel fell ill while appearing in And I'm the Queen of Sheba at the Browns Mart Theatre in Darwin, and he died on 20 November 2016.

Early life
Kiefel was born in Tully, Queensland in 1951, to Alf, an accountant, and Patsy, a homemaker. He has two younger sisters. After moving to Brisbane, Kiefel attended Sandgate High School. During his teenage years, he became interested in acting and was a member of the La Boite Theatre Company. Kiefel moved to Sydney so he could attend the National Institute of Dramatic Art, and he graduated in 1974.

Career

Theatre
Kiefel was a prolific stage actor and worked with various theatre companies throughout his career, including Sydney Theatre Company (STC), Bell Shakespeare, and Queensland Theatre Company. His earliest roles were with the Old Tote Theatre Company in productions at the Sydney Opera House from 1977. Throughout the 1980s, Kiefel worked with the State Theatre Company of South Australia. He made 13 appearances for the STC. He appeared in Our Town, and the Australian and American seasons of A Streetcar Named Desire and Travelling North. In November 1987, Kiefel played Valantin, alongside Barry Otto, in Egil Kipste's production of Kiss of the Spider Woman for the Nimrod Theatre Company. Kiefel began working with the Queensland Theatre Company in 1988 in productions of Night and Day and The Recruiting Officer. He was also associated with the Belvoir company and appeared in several productions for them, including Ray's Tempest, Stuff Happens, Hamlet, The Power of Yes, The Business and Run Rabbit Run.

While appearing as Surly in the company's 1996 production of The Alchemist, Kiefel had to leave during one show after learning that his wife had gone into labour. His co-star Sam Wilcox took over his role for the second act. Later stage roles saw Kiefel appear in Tom Holloway's And No More Shall We Part for the Griffin Theatre Company. He starred in the 2009 production of The Alchemist at the Playhouse, Sydney Opera House. This time he played the role of Master Lovewit. In 2016, Kiefel performed in The Blind Giant is Dancing for Belvoir. He had starred in the show three times previously, including the original production in 1983. New play And I'm the Queen of Sheba was Kiefel's final stage performance. It opened at the Browns Mart Theatre on 17 November. Kiefel played the role of Frank and had been involved in the production since April 2016.

Television and film
Kiefel began his screen acting career with a role in Gillian Armstrong's 1977 feature film The Singer and the Dancer. He went on to appear in the 1980 film Breaker Morant, Neil Armfield's 1986 film version of Twelfth Night, Call Me Mr. Brown, which was made in 1985 but not released until 1990, telemovie The Leaving of Liverpool, and comedy drama feature Children of the Revolution. Other film roles included No Escape (1994), Radiance (1998), Dogwatch (1999) and Fresh Air (1999).

Kiefel made numerous recurring and guest appearances in television series, including Wildside, Water Rats, Blue Heelers, Stingers and Something in the Air. He played Roy O'Neale in Home and Away from 1993 to 1994. Following this, he guested in children's science-fiction drama Escape from Jupiter, and joined the cast of Heartbreak High. In 1998, he starred in an episode of the anthology and mystery drama series Twisted Tales, alongside Robert Taylor. Kiefel was part of the ensemble cast of television film The Junction Boys, which centres on the life of American college football coach Bear Bryant. After appearing in the ABC television film Fireflies in 2003, Kiefel was subsequently cast in the lead role of Sharpie in the television series of the same name. In 2008, Kiefel appeared as political adviser Lloyd Ross in the television documentary Infamous Victory: Ben Chifley's Battle for Coal. He was also part of the ensemble cast of the 2014 telemovie Schapelle.

Artist Demian Carey Gibbins painted Kiefel in 2015, and reached the semi-finals of the Doug Moran National Portrait Prize with the piece he titled A Familiar Face. From 29 July 2015, Kiefel played the role of Russell Brennan in the television soap opera Neighbours. His character was introduced as the father of the established Brennan brothers, and his arrival started a domestic violence storyline for the family. Kiefel had previously worked as a scriptwriter for the serial in the 1990s. Producers had plans to bring the character back following his initial arc, but they had to change the storyline due to Kiefel's death. They introduced his character's former wife Fay Brennan (played by Zoe Bertram) instead. Kiefel's later television appearances were recurring and guest roles in Tricky Business, Childhood's End and Secret City.

Personal life
Kiefel was married to actress Katrina Foster. The couple had two sons.

Kiefel died on 20 November 2016. He had fallen ill on 18 November, while appearing in a production of And I'm the Queen of Sheba at the Browns Mart Theatre in Darwin. The theatre cancelled the rest of the season out of respect, and later held a memorial for Kiefel  on 18 December. Kiefel's former co-stars and friends paid tribute to him on social media. He is survived by his sisters, his wife and sons.

Filmography

Film

Television

References

External links
 
Russell Kiefel at the BFI

1951 births
2016 deaths
Male actors from Queensland
Australian male film actors
Australian male stage actors
Australian male soap opera actors
20th-century Australian male actors
National Institute of Dramatic Art alumni